The Frissbee KR4 was an American sports prototype racing car, built by Frissbee in 1984 for the Can-Am series. Originally built by Lola Cars as a Lola T330, it featured a 5-liter Chevrolet V8 engine, and was used by Horst Kroll Racing between 1986 and 1987. Paul Tracy and Bill Adam both drove the car in Can-Am in 1986, and Jacques Villeneuve and Mike Engstrand drove the car in the Canadian American Thundercars Championship in 1987.

References

Sports prototypes
Can-Am cars
Lola racing cars